Merlin is a legendary character who has appeared multiple times throughout comic books especially in DC Comics and Marvel Comics.

DC Comics

The first adaption of Merlin first appeared in a King Arthur based comic book story in the anthology comic book series entitled originally New Comics (later re-titled Adventure Comics) in issue #3 in Feb. 1936 by Rafael Astarita, kicking off a six-issue adaptation of "The Tale of Sir Gareth of Orkney" by Sir Thomas Malory. He was also one of the earliest appeared recurring characters in a DC Comics title appearing only slightly after Doctor Occult and before Slam Bradley and Superman.

In a Superboy story, he appears as a scientist of King Arthur's time who looks like Mr. Mxyzptlk, but also has the gift of Second Sight.

The first modern version of Merlin is linked to his appearance in The Demon #1 (Sept. 1972). In this series, Merlin summons the demon Etrigan to combat Morgaine le Fey, and appears in several more issues of the series. These events are shown from a different point of view in Madame Xanadu vol. 2 #1 (Aug. 2008), a Vertigo Comics title. In The Demon vol. 2 #1 (April 1987), Merlin is established as Etrigan's half-demon brother and subsequent uses of the character have followed this back story.

Merlin is the half-demon son of the demon Belial and an unknown human woman and the younger half-brother of the demons Lord Scapegoat and Etrigan. His very first appearance has him serving his traditional tutelary role to King Arthur in Camelot, alongside Lancelot, Guinevere, and Gareth.

Merlin had further adventures in King Arthur's court. He gave a magical suit of armor (which protects its wearer from all forms of harm) and a sword (capable of cutting any substance except the aforementioned suit), as well as a winged horse named Victory to the Shining Knight. He also guided squire Brian Kent, the young man who became the Silent Knight.

Merlin's father Belial had him trained in the arts of sorcery so that he could use his powers to control his older brother Etrigan. As a result, Merlin traveled far and wide on the mortal plane, studying various schools of magic. Eventually he became learned enough to bind his brother, and was responsible for binding Etrigan to the body and soul of the druid Iason, who would later be known as Jason Blood. Merlin employed the now-controllable demon in the defense of Camelot, against his nemesis Morgaine le Fey, her army of demons, and her son Mordred. Before Morgaine le Fey's attack, Merlin subdued his other brother Lord Scapegoat and the Thing-That-Cannot-Die, banishing them to the Region Beyond, and set Sir Percival the Golden Knight to guard the Region's exit, which is located in England. The Region Beyond, possibly located in the Infernal Province known as the Labyrinth, is where King Arthur had Merlin banish all the dangerous mystical entities native to Great Britain.

Etrigan was able to defeat Morgaine le Fey and her demon army, and Arthur slew Mordred. But the Phantom Stranger made sure that the fall of Camelot could not be prevented, by arranging Merlin's ensorcellment by his student Nimue Inwudu (Madame Xanadu). Merlin eventually escapes this fate and has appeared elsewhere in DC Comics, living an immortal existence throughout the centuries and aiding various heroes.

In the Pre-Crisis DC Comics universe, Merlin possessed a magical crystal ball which he allowed the Justice League of America to keep after they helped him to defeat a trio of evil sorcerers. This Merlin comes from the alternate world of Magic-Land, where scientific laws do not apply, but magic does. This self-same crystal ball was used a short time later to communicate across dimensions with the Justice Society of America of Earth-Two. Both teams of heroes coordinated their efforts to defeat a group of villains known as the "Crime Champions". In another story Superboy, when travelling through time to find a red kryptonite meteor, meets Merlin, who looks like Mr. Mxyzptlk. Merlin here uses an early form of science, but shows he is able to see into the future.

Other artifacts once owned by Merlin have shown up all over the DC Universe. A time traveler named Lord Satanis and his wife Syrene both sought the "Runestone of Merlin", and manipulated Superman in pursuit of it. The "Book of Eternity", which was Merlin's book of spells, is currently wielded by Selma Tolon of Turkey, an adventurer who calls herself the "Janissary". The Philosopher's Stone was the magical focus used by Merlin to bond the druid Iason to Etrigan. It later fell into the hands of Doctor Albert Desmond, the criminal known as Doctor Alchemy. The magical armor he crafted for the Shining Knight's sidekick Percy Sheldrake, the Squire, was passed on to Percival's son Cyril Sheldrake, now known as the Knight.

In the Vertigo Comics miniseries The Names of Magic, Timothy Hunter encounters a version of Merlin still trapped under an enchanted sleep in a cave in Cornwall. Merlin explains that Tim is his creation, a spiritual successor to the title of "the Merlin" (a living conduit of magic). He created Tim with multiple contradictory origins to enhance his legend. This Merlin's connection to the mainstream DC Comics version is unclear, though it would seem that like Tim, Merlin is also a living legend of contradictory histories. In addition to sleeping in the cave, the series claims that aspects of Merlin are trapped in a forest in France, under a hill in Wales, and on an island in an invisible house of glass. In the subsequent ongoing series Hunter: The Age of Magic, Merlin's spirit manifests through Tim's owl, Yoyo, and becomes the boy's teacher, until his body is slain by the Brotherhood of the Cold Flame and his spirit passes on.

As of the Trials of Shazam maxiseries, the aspect of Merlin still free in the world now exhibits a visible demonic aspect and goes by his Welsh name "Myrddin". He has also revealed the existence of several half-demon children sired and tutored by him. These descendants refer to themselves collectively as the "Council of Merlin". His favored daughter Sabina, a Creole witch, recently failed in her bid for the power of Shazam, which would have made her his anchor to Earth, and was instead killed when drawn into a portal in a battle with Freddy Freeman by Zeus.

In The New 52, Merlin makes his debut in Demon Knights #1, again as the magician of King Arthur's court and is responsible for Etrigan and Jason Blood merging. Years later, he was killed by a daemonite-controlled disciple in the city of Alba Sarum. However, the Demon Knights, although betrayed by Etrigan, are able to bring his body to Avalon, resurrecting the magician, who then uses his mystical powers to help defeat the invading forces of Lucifer and Queen Questing. In the present, Merlin is called Adam One and is the leader of Stormwatch, but is eventually replaced and, by the words of the Shadow Cabinet's emissary, clinically killed since this is the only way to enter the Cabinet's dimension. He later appears to Jenny Quantum in a dream and explains to her the team's origins. Later, in Stormwatch #19, extra-dimensional aliens kill Adam One at the moment of creation, averting the Demon Knights' backstory for Stormwatch and effectively rebooting the entire comic book.

In the Elseworlds story Batman: Dark Knight of the Round Table, Merlin counsels a Round Table made up of setting appropriate analogs of the Justice League of America.

Other versions

Camelot 3000
An alternate version of Merlin appears in the maxiseries Camelot 3000, where characters from Arthurian myth have no contact with DC superheroes in present day. This Merlin is an immortal who calls King Arthur from Glastonbury Tor in the year 3000 to stave off an alien invasion spearheaded by Morgan le Fay.

In other media

Television
 Merlin appears in the 1960s episode of The Adventures of Superboy called "The Black Knight". He becomes jealous of Superboy's powers at the time when he and Timmy are transported to the days of King Arthur.
 Merlin appears in The Freedom Force as part of the titular team alongside heroes such as Isis and Hercules. This segment was part of Tarzan and the Super 7, which was a continuation of The Batman/Tarzan Adventure Hour.
 Merlin appeared in the Justice League episode "A Knight of Shadows" Pt. 1, voiced by W. Morgan Sheppard. After Morgaine le Fey persuades a knight named Jason Blood to betray King Arthur by letting her armies into Camelot which followed up with Morgaine poisoning him, Merlin appeared during the conflict and punishes Jason Blood by binding Etrigan to him.
 Merlin appeared in the Batman: The Brave and the Bold episode "Day of the Dark Knight!", voiced by David McCallum. He also makes a non-speaking appearance in the episode "The Siege of Starro!", being trapped by Morgaine le Fay but freed by Etrigan.
 Merlin appears in Justice League Action, voiced by Dan Donohue in "Speed Demon" and by Patrick Seitz in "Hat Trick". In "Speed Demon", he is called upon by Etrigan to help take on the Batmobile after it was enchanted by Brother Night. As Merlin attempts to use it on a police car, the enchanted Batmobile tries to attack Merlin only for him to be saved by Etrigan. As the police car was wrecked, Etrigan  has Merlin enchant the nearby ice cream truck instead. In "Hat Trick", Etrigan contacts Merlin to have him teleport him, Batman, and Zatanna to the Hebrides to reclaim Zatanna's hat from Felix Faust.
 A female interpretation of Merlin appears on the second season of The CW series Legends of Tomorrow. This version is a disguise used by Courtney Whitmore (portrayed by Sarah Grey). In 1942, Courtney was a member of the World War II-era JSA. She and the rest of the group confront the time-traveling Legends team, whom the team initially views as enemies. Stargirl and the rest of her team (excluding Vixen and Obsidian) go missing in 1956 during a mission in which everyone was assumed to have been killed in action. Instead, she escaped to the sixth century where she used a fragment of the Spear of Destiny to create the court of Camelot with herself as Merlin.

Film
 Merlin appears in Justice League Dark, voiced by JB Blanc.

Marvel Comics
Merlin is the name of multiple fictional characters appearing in American comic books published by Marvel Comics.

The first Merlin of the Marvel Universe is apparently the figure of Arthurian legend, hailing from 6th century A.D. Britain. He was born in Carmarthen, Wales. He was a powerful sorcerer who acted as teacher, adviser, and defender of King Arthur Pendragon of Camelot. Merlin warned King Arthur that his son, Mordred would be responsible for the end of Camelot, but before Arthur could put the baby to death, he was rescued and raised in anonymity. Merlin was responsible for teaching magic to Morgan le Fay, though she turned against him and became one of King Arthur's greatest foes.

Knowing that Britain would need a champion to face the likes of Mordred and Morgan, he sought a boy to become the first Black Knight. He had this boy, Percy, trained in all known forms of combat, and when he grew up, Sir Percy was presented with the Ebony Blade.

When Kang traveled back to the days of Camelot, Merlin was defeated and imprisoned by Kang, who planned to change history. Merlin defeated Kang, however, with the aid of time travelers the Human Torch and the Thing who the Watcher had transported back in time.

Merlin cast a spell over the dying Sir Percy so that he would have successors in future centuries.

Merlin was finally placed in suspended animation within an enchanted cave by the faerie sorceress Nimue. His spirit continued to appear in astral form and advise the original Black Knight, but he was no longer seen in his physical body.

It was later depicted how Merlin magically imprisoned Morgan le Fay within her castle.

Merlin allied with St. Brendan against the Darkhold's power.

Later was revealed further information about Merlin's alliance with the original Black Knight and imprisonment of Morgan.

It was also depicted how Merlin banished Tyrannus to Subterranea.

Other beings have also claimed the name Merlin, besides the Merlin of Arthurian legend:

This being was apparently 10,000 years old, and apparently was a savage that came to possess some portion of the same Bloodgem that Ulysses Bloodstone would later possess, which gave him immortality and eternal youth. He later came to Britain during the time of Camelot, and impersonated the real Merlin while he was away. The Eternal Sersi exposed the impostor, and the real Merlin placed him in suspended animation.

The false Merlin was revived in modern times after his coffin was found, attacked Washington, D.C., and fought Thor. Thor imprisoned him back inside the coffin he was found in after pretending to be a powerful shapeshifter and ordering Merlin to go back into suspended animation. He later took the name Warlock, and fought the X-Men. He later fought the Beast, the Hulk, and the Iceman under the name Maha Yogi. During his encounter with the Hulk, his fragment of the Bloodgem was destroyed and he rapidly aged into helplessness.

He claimed to be a mutant, later retconned as having been altered by aliens and had the ability to control the minds of others, create illusions, project force bolts, levitate objects, teleport himself, create force fields and alter his own appearance.

Another being posing as Merlin was sent by Immortus to fight the Avengers. This being was revealed to be a shapechanging Dire Wraith with absolutely no connection to the real Merlin.

The being Merlyn also claims to be the real Merlin and appears to be a gestalt of the various other Merlins within the Marvel Multiverse.

Peter Hunter, the British costumed champion known as Albion, a member of the Knights of Pendragon, is alleged to be the current reincarnation of Merlin.

Merlin also appeared in the Marvel UK Doctor Who comic appearing first in "The Neutron Knights" story and later in the longer "The Tides of Time". This Merlin was one of the High Evolutionaries of the Cosmos, a group that also includes Rassilon, the founder of the Time Lords, which guarded the timestream.

It appears that this Merlin removed a shard of the Fury that had embedded itself into Merlyn, the physical amalgamations of all his interdimensional counterparts, while at the same time taking his other counterparts' madness out along with it. This allowed Merlin to take over control away from Merlyn. Merlin, who was imprisoned in a dimension used by Otherworld fairy king Oberon to keep evil at bay, was freed by Pete Wisdom during the Skrull invasion of Earth. Magically reversing the effect of the shard of the Fury, Merlin used it to resurrect Captain Britain in Captain Britain and MI: 13 #3.

Merlyn returned in the 2019 run of Excalibur now calling himself "The Great Hierophant Merlyn", as the ruler of "The Holy Republic of Fae" part of the Foul Courts of Otherworld. His daughter Roma runs "The Floating Kingdom of Roma Regina" in the Fair Courts and as shown in an arc in New Mutants the two aren't on speaking terms. He becomes a major antagonist in the books final arc when it's revealed he's working with pre-established villains Morgana La Fey and Coven Akkaba, and shares their hatred for "Witchbreed" (mutants). He was working with a returned King Arthur who wanted to take back control of Avalon from acting king Jamie Braddock with the ulterior motive of wanting to take over Otherworld. He achieves this goal by invading the Starlight Citadel and after forcing Omniversal Majestrix Saturnyne to retreat with the Captain Britain Corps, renames it the "Lunatic Citadel". In the final issue it's revealed how his grudge against Saturnyne began. After Otherworld and the Captain Britain Corps were destroyed by the Mapmakers Saturnyne escaped with a captive Mapmaker and they ended up in the future Otherworld province Blightspoke, there she was contacted by Merlyn and Roma in spirit form and made a deal with Roma that she would rebuild Otherworld with the Mapmakers power and become Omniversal Magestrix in exchange for making the Fair Courts for her to rule and the Foul Courts for her father to rule. Merlyn then becomes the main antagonist of the books sequel series Knights of X ruling Otherworld with an iron fist within the Lunatic Citadel.

In other media

Television
 An alternate reality version of Merlin appears in the Ultimate Spider-Man episode "Spider-Verse" Pt. 3, voiced by Tom Kenny. This version resides in a medieval reality where that world's Peter Parker works as Spyder-Knight. After Spider-Man and Spyder-Knight defeated the Alchemist (that reality's version of Doctor Octopus) and his Kraken creation, they visit Merlin who uses his magic to enable Spider-Man to activate the residue of the Siege Perilous' magic so that Spider-Man can pursue Green Goblin to the next universe.
 Merlin appears in the Marvel Future Avengers episode "Out of Time", voiced by Shozo Sasaki in Japanese and Mick Wingert in English.

Video games
 Merlin appears in Lego Marvel Super Heroes 2. In a bonus mission narrated by Gwenpool, Merlin accompanies King Arthur to the basement of Garret Castle only for them to fight Morgan le Fay and Kree Sentry-459. Merlin can be unlocked by completing "The Sorcerer's Stone" side mission by searching all of Chronopolis for his 10 missing stones.

Other notable appearances
 Merlin is a major character in Matt Wagner's Mage series, which features a reincarnated King Arthur as the character Kevin Matchstick. He is presented as the World Mage and is a paraplegic in the first series Mage: The Hero Discovered. He is depicted as an old man named Wally Ut, who Kevin thinks of as a crackpot until he reveals himself in Mage: The Hero Defined.
 Merlin is the title-character in Merlin, a comic book by Robin Wood and Enrique Alcatena.
 Merlin is a member of the titular knights in The Seven Deadly Sins, representing the Sin of Gluttony.

See also
King Arthur in comics

References

Merlin

DC Comics fantasy characters
DC Comics characters who use magic
DC Comics demons
DC Comics hybrids
Fictional half-demons
Mythology in DC Comics
Marvel Comics characters who use magic